Roberto Bautista Agut was the defending champion, but chose not to participate this year.

Daniil Medvedev won the title, defeating Steve Johnson in the final, 6–4, 6–4.

Seeds
All seeds receive a bye into the second round.

Draw

Finals

Top half

Section 1

Section 2

Bottom half

Section 3

Section 4

Qualifying

Seeds

Qualifiers

Lucky losers

Qualifying draw

First qualifier

Second qualifier

Third qualifier

Fourth qualifier

References

Sources
Main draw
Qualifying draw

2018 ATP World Tour
2018 Singles